Fallowfield a suburb of the city of Manchester, England.

Fallowfield may also refer to:

Places
 Fallowfield, Ottawa, a neighbourhood of Ottawa, Canada
 Fallowfield Township, Washington County, Pennsylvania, US
 Fallowfield, Pennsylvania, an unincorporated community, US
 Fallowfield Stadium, athletics stadium and velodrome in Fallowfield, Manchester, England. Now demolished and non-existent

People
 Bill Fallowfield, British rugby league football coach and administrator
 Ryan Fallowfield, English footballer